Plaça de Catalunya (meaning in English "Catalonia Square"; sometimes referred to as Plaza de Cataluña, its Spanish name) is a large square in central Barcelona that is generally considered to be both its city centre and the place where the old city (see Barri Gòtic and Raval, in Ciutat Vella) and the 19th century-built Eixample meet.

Some of the city's most important streets and avenues meet at Plaça Catalunya: Passeig de Gràcia, Rambla de Catalunya, La Rambla, and Portal de l'Àngel, in addition to Ronda de Sant Pere, Carrer de Vergara, and Carrer de Pelai. The plaza occupies an area of about 50,000 square metres. It is especially known for its fountains and statues, its proximity to some of Barcelona's most popular attractions, and the flocks of pigeons that gather in the centre. The square played a significant part in the Spanish Civil War, in particular as a site of key events of the May Days.

History
After the medieval city walls were demolished in the 19th century, ambitious designs for the city's public spaces were conceived under the guidance of notable urban planners. Plaça Catalunya was conceived as part of pla Rovira in 1859, but no official permission from the government was given until the 1888 Universal Exposition. It was urbanised for the first time in 1902 and was further modified in 1929, on the occasion of the 1929 Barcelona International Exposition, which also included the construction of a metro station. Architect Francesc de Paula Nebot designed the changes made in 1929.

In May 2011 Plaça Catalunya was the main location where anti-government protests and sit ins were held in Barcelona, mirroring the events in other Spanish cities.

Art

Sculpture
Plaça Catalunya is the site of several notable public sculptures and monuments representative of Noucentisme, Neo-Classicism and different avant-garde movements.
Deessa, by Josep Clarà.
Pastor de Pau, by Pablo Gargallo.
Francesc Macià monument. The inscription reads: "Catalunya a Francesc Macià".
Josep Llimona's sculptures.

Decorative arts 
The Barcelona Telephone Exchange (Edificio Telefónica) has four stained glass windows, designed in 1991, installed in the tower lantern. Commissioned from the artist Brian Clarke to commemorate the 1992 Olympic Games hosted by the city, the artworks were fabricated by the local Fundació Centre del Vidre, and conceived to function as a coloured beacon overlooking the square.

The mosaics that decorate the walls of the underground part of Plaça Catalunya were designed by pupils of Escola Massana.

Culture

Theatre
A few theatres have been established in Plaça Catalunya since its construction, none of which are extant.
Teatre del Bon Retir (1876-1885)
Circ Eqüestre Alegria (1879-1895)
Eldorado Concert (1887-1929)
Teatre Barcelona (1923-198-)
There still are, however, other theatres in the nearby area, located in other streets or squares.

Cafés and restaurants

Similarly, most of the cafés and restaurants where writers and artists would meet in the city haven't survived, with the notable exception of Café Zurich, where Fabiola of Belgium's brother worked as a pianist. The following ones disappeared with the Spanish Civil War:
Maison Dorée
Café Colón
La Lluna
Cafè Suís

Other services

Shopping centres
El Corte Inglés
El Triangle, containing a three-story fnac shop.
Sfera

Hotels
H10 Catalunya Plaza
Hotel Monegal
Olivia Plaza Hotel: 4 stars hotel. Olivia Plaza Phone +34933168700
Hotel Urquinaona Hotel Urquinaona

Financial institutions
Banco Español de Crédito (Banesto).
Banco Bilbao Vizcaya Argentaria (BBVA).
Banco de España
Caja Madrid

Foreign relations
 Consulate of Canada, Second Floor, 9 Placa de Catalunya.

Transport

 
The square is also one of Barcelona's most important transport hubs, both above and under ground.

Metro
The original Barcelona metro line in Barcelona, known as Gran Metro, had Plaça Catalunya as one of its termini. It went to become the current green line, L3, operated by TMB. It's also served by two FGC lines.
Catalunya (L1, L3, L6, L7)
Passeig de Gràcia (L2, L3, L4).

Bus lines

Day bus
Bus 9 Pl. Catalunya - Pg. Zona Franca
Bus 14 Vil·la Olímpica - Pg. Bonanova
Bus 16 Urquinaona - Pg. Manuel Girona
Bus 17 Barceloneta - Av. Jordà
Bus 24 Av. Paral·lel - Carmel
Bus 28 Pl. Catalunya - Carmel
Bus 41 Pl. Francesc Macià - Diagonal Mar
Bus 42 Pl. Catalunya - Santa Coloma
Bus 55 Parc de Montjuïc - Plaça Catalana
Bus 58 Pl. Catalunya - Av. Tibidabo
Bus 59 Pg. Marítim - Plaça Reina Maria Cristina
Bus 66 Pl. Catalunya - Sarrià
Bus 67 Pl. Catalunya - Cornellà
Bus 68 Pl. Catalunya - Cornellà
Bus 141 Av. Mistral - Barri del Besòs
Aerobus
Liyver

Nitbus
N1 Zona Franca (Mercabarna) - Pl. Catalunya - Roquetes (Aiguablava)
N2 Av. Carrilet - Pl. Catalunya - Badalona (Montigalà)
N3 Collblanc - Montcada i Reixac
N4 Via Favència - Pl. Catalunya - Gran Vista
N5 Pl. Catalunya - Gran Vista
N6 Barcelona (Roquetes) - Santa Coloma (Oliveres)
N7 Pl. Pedralbes - Pl. Llevant (Fòrum)
N8 Can Caralleu - Santa Coloma (Can Franquesa)
N9 Pl. Portal de la Pau - Tiana (Edith Llaurador)
N11 Barcelona (Pl. Catalunya) - H. Can Ruti

Guided tours

Train
Barcelona Plaça Catalunya railway station

In popular culture
Plaça de Catalunya is a featured locale in the 2009 video game Wheelman, published by Midway Games.

See also

Avinguda de la Llum
Font de Canaletes
History of Barcelona
List of streets and squares in Eixample

 Street names in Barcelona
 Urban planning of Barcelona

References and external links
 ALBAREDA, Joaquim, GUÀRDIA, Manel i altres. Enciclopèdia de Barcelona, Gran Enciclopèdia Catalana, Barcelona, 2006.
 City map at Bcn.es 
 360° panoramic view

Eixample
Plazas in Barcelona
Central business districts
1929 Barcelona International Exposition
World's fair sites in Barcelona